The women's 60 metres hurdles event at the 2012 IAAF World Indoor Championships was held at the Ataköy Athletics Arena on 9 and 10 March.

Medalists

Records

Qualification standards

Schedule

Results

Heats
Qualification: First 3 of each heat (Q) and 4 fastest times qualified (q)

Semifinals
Qualification: First 4 of each heat (Q) qualified

Final
The final began at 19:45.

References

60 metres Hurdles
60 metres hurdles at the World Athletics Indoor Championships
2012 in women's athletics